Marianne Theresa Herbert (born 2 December 1981) is an Irish former cricketer who played as a right-arm medium bowler. She appeared in 15 One Day Internationals and 5 Twenty20 Internationals for Ireland between 2002 and 2009, including being part of Ireland's squad for the 2005 Women's Cricket World Cup. She also played in the 2015 Women's Super 3s for Scorchers.

References

External links
 
 

1981 births
Living people
Irish women cricketers
Ireland women One Day International cricketers
Ireland women Twenty20 International cricketers
Scorchers (women's cricket) cricketers
People from Malahide
Sportspeople from Fingal